Plasmodium parahexamerium is a parasite of the genus Plasmodium subgenus Novyella. As in all Plasmodium species, P. parahexamerium has both vertebrate and insect hosts. The vertebrate hosts for this parasite are birds.

Taxonomy
The parasite was first described by Valkiūnas et al. in 2009.

Distribution
This parasite is found in West Africa.

Vectors
Not known.

Hosts
P. parahexamerium infects the white-tailed alethe (Alethe diademata).

References

parahexamerium
Parasites of birds